Bullock's oriole (Icterus bullockii) is a small New World blackbird. At one time, this species and the Baltimore oriole were considered to be a single species, the northern oriole. This bird is named after William Bullock, an English amateur naturalist.

Description

Bullock's orioles are sexually dimorphic, with males being more brightly colored than females. In addition, adult males tend to be slightly larger and heavier than females.

Measurements:

 Length: 6.7-7.5 in (17-19 cm)
 Weight: 1.0-1.5 oz (29-43 g)
 Wingspan: 12.2 in (31 cm)

Adults have a pointed bill with a straight culmen. In adult males, the tail is long, square, and jet black. All exposed skin is black, as are the claws and bill, though the base of the lower mandible lightens to bluish-gray.

Adult males are characterized by strongly contrasting orange and black plumage, a black throat patch, and a white wing bar. The underparts, breast, and face are orange or yellow; by contrast, the back, wings, and tail are black. A black line extends from each eye to the black crown. The wing coverts (feathers not directly used in flight) are fringed white, forming a wing patch. Although the tail is mostly black, the outermost three or four rectrices (flight feathers) are tipped orange, forming a T shape. Adult females, by contrast, have gray-brown upperparts, duller yellow on the breast and underparts, and an olive crown. Some females may also have a dark throat patch, similar to (but less extensive than) the one found in adult males; in all cases, females lack the black eye-line present in adult males. Females with throat patches are thought to be older individuals.

Following the general pattern observed among icterids, the overall plumage pattern seen in immature male Bullock's orioles closely resembles that seen in adult females. Juveniles resemble adult females, but have darker wings, fresh wing coverts, and a pink or whitish bill. Sexual dimorphism is not obvious in juveniles.

Reproduction

Bullock's orioles are seasonally monogamous. The breeding season typically lasts from May until July. The exact timing of the beginning of the breeding season tends to vary geographically; in general, breeding begins later in the northernmost and westernmost portions of its geographic range. Mated pairs of Bullock's orioles cooperate to weave deep, pendant baskets in which are deposited between three and six eggs, though females tend to do much of the work. The nest is woven of plant fibers, primarily bark and fine grass fiber, though animal hair is also commonly used. The nest is lined with down, hair, and moss.

Both males and females rear the young and defend the nest from predators and nest parasites.

Bullock's orioles and Baltimore orioles typically hybridize in the Midwest where their geographic ranges overlap.

Communication
Both males and females sing. While males have a sweeter voice, females tend to be more prolific singers. This bird's song is similar to that of the Baltimore oriole, but faster and somewhat more harsh.

Distribution
Bullock's orioles are native to western North America, though  they are sometimes found as vagrants in the eastern half of the continent. During the breeding season, they are found as far west as the eastern foothills of the Cascade Range. Their breeding range stretches east to the Dakotas, Kansas, and northern Central Texas. This species can be found as far north as British Columbia in Canada and as far south as Sonora or Durango in Mexico. It is common throughout its range, but is absent in parts of Arizona and Idaho, where a combination of extreme elevation and an arid climate make for poor living conditions. During winter, this species retreats to Mexico and northern Central America. Its winter range extends south and east from Sinaloa to Oaxaca.

Behavior

Habitat
Like other members of the Icteridae, Bullock's orioles prefer habitat edges. They especially prefer riparian corridors, open deciduous woodland, and scrub forest. Observations during the breeding season indicate that members of this species prefer areas with an abundance of cottonwood, pecan, and (if near water) willow. In dry areas, this species prefers salt cedar and mesquite. In California, eucalyptus trees are used as major sources of nectar.

Diet
These birds forage in trees and shrubs, also making short flights to catch insects. They mainly eat insects, berries, and nectar. Other fruits eaten include oranges and sometimes grapes. In some locations, they may be seen using hummingbird feeders.

These birds readily come to a dish filled with grape jelly. Their parents lead the fledglings, feed them jelly, and then the adult males leave the area. The young stay at the jelly dish from first feeding in early July and leave late September.

Related species
For a time Bullock's orioles were considered conspecific with Baltimore orioles, but breeding data, later followed by data on molt timing and DNA, showed that Bullock's orioles are a distinct species.

References

External links 

 Bullock's oriole Species Account - Cornell Lab of Ornithology
 Bullock's oriole - Encyclopedia of Life
 Bullock's oriole - Icterus bullockii - USGS Patuxent Bird Identification InfoCenter
 Bullock's oriole - BirdHouses101.com
 
 
 
 
 

Bullock's oriole
Native birds of the Western United States
Native birds of the Plains-Midwest (United States)
Bullock's oriole
Bullock's oriole
Taxobox binomials not recognized by IUCN